Couva is an urban town (48,858 in 2011 census) in west-central Trinidad, south of Port of Spain and Chaguanas and north of San Fernando and Point Fortin. It is the capital and main urban centre of Couva–Tabaquite–Talparo, and the Greater Couva area includes the Point Lisas Industrial Estate and the Port of Point Lisas. It is one of the fastest-growing towns in the country. Couva's southern boundary is at the village of California & Point Lisas, and to the north Couva stretches to McBean (both on the Trinidad Southern Main Road). To the east of Couva is Preysal. To the west of Couva is the road to Waterloo and Carli Bay, which are located on the Gulf of Paria. Couva was part of the Caroni County. Couva is considered a major power base for the United National Congress (UNC), whose headquarters was previously located here.

History 
The first British map of Trinidad, made in 1797 after the island was surrendered by Spain, suggested the existence of a river in the area now known as Couva called "Rio de Cuba". Over time, perhaps due to the Spanish "B" having a sound similar to that of the letter "V" in English, the river became known as "Rio de Couva" which was eventually translated as "Couva River". British settlement of what is now referred to as Couva began a little to the north of the mouth of this river.

For many years, the village was little more than a clearing in a sugarcane field. The population was mainly indentured workers of Indian origin with a smaller number of former African slaves and numbered no more than a few hundred.  This all changed with the arrival of the railway to Couva in 1880. By 1921, it had grown to a population of 2,667 but, in the decade leading up to 1931, this number fell to 1,895. During World War II, the Camden (Field) Auxiliary Air Base was established as an emergency airstrip. It included one paved  x  runway with extensive taxiways and dispersed camouflaged parking bays for USAAC, USN and RN. It was defended by US Army infantry and AAA units.

Couva continued to grow in size with the national census recording a figure of 3,572 persons in 1980. Historically, the majority of its people have worked on the nearby sugar estates but due to its strategic locations many residents have found employment with the oil refinery at Pointe-a-Pierre, only 13 km (8 mi) away and at the Point Lisas industrial estate located west of the town centre.

Couva was profoundly affected by the closure of Caroni (1975) Ltd. in the early 2000s, particularly its residents who worked on the nearby sugar cane estates and the associated small and medium enterprises which supported this industry. Since this period the town has recovered through utilisation of the now open sugar lands for new housing and business initiatives. Consequently, while the nearby town of Chaguanas has evolved and expanded significantly to become the de facto administrative and commercial capital of Central Trinidad, Couva's character has changed to become magnet for industrialisation, commercial, sports, health, education, aviation and residential projects.

Climate

The climate of Couva is tropical, more specifically tropical monsoon, with a short dry season February to April and a lengthy wet season May to January. Temperature varies little between the wet and dry seasons.

Development and demise of the sugar production industry 
In 1937, there were two major developments which occurred on these sugar lands of Central Trinidad. One was the formation of the All Trinidad Sugar Estates Factory Workers Trade Union which for the first time gave representation to many thousands of sugar workers who had revolted in 1935, 1936 and 1937 against slave conditions on the sugar estates. Under the leadership of Adrian Cola Rienzi, they transformed the nature of the industry.

At the same time, Caroni (1937) was created when Tate and Lyle, a British multi-national company bought our Caroni Sugar Estates (Trinidad) Ltd making a conglomerate which included Waterloo on the Western coast and Brechin Castle in Couva. By 1940, the landscape of its headquarters Brechin Castle was changed by the construction of the factory and the four cooling ponds at the back as well as major company offices, the dispensary, Sevilla School, Sevilla Club and residences for mainly expatriate senior staff.

In 1960, Caroni bought out Usine Ste. Madeleine factory, which had grown considerably since its founding in 1870. In 1975, the state bought the conglomerate, calling it Caroni (1975) Ltd, which continued producing sugar but went into diversification, producing citrus, prawns, large and small ruminants and rice.

By the end of the 20th century, as oil became increasingly significant, the sugar industry and agriculture generally sank into a low second place until the state closed down Caroni Ltd in 2003, retrenching 9,000 workers directly and a further 35,000 who were indirectly dependent on the industry.

Establishment of the Point Lisas Industrial Estate 
 
Point Lisas is a petrochemical and heavy industrial estate clustered around a series of port facilities 
on Trinidad's sheltered western coastline. Construction of major plants in the estate did not begin until the 1970s. Since then, the Point Lisas Industrial Estate has been a major success story in Trinidad and Tobago's recent economic history and the development of natural gas-based industry on the estate has been a major impetus for the transformation of Trinidad & Tobago into a gas-based economy. The location at Point Lisas was chosen due to the nature of the coastline and crucially the availability of large tracts of flat undeveloped land next to the coast. This landholding belonged to Caroni Ltd, at that time a private company owned by Tate and Lyle in London.

The "estate" is now home to over 90 companies, e.g. YARA, Phoenix Park Gas Processors Ltd. (PPGPL), PLIPDECO, and Methanex. This includes the world's largest methanol plant, along with five additional plants, produces ca. 13% of global methanol output. National Gas Company of Trinidad and Tobago (NGC) was founded alongside this as an aggregator and distributor of feedstock provided by the upstream. The idea behind NGC was to consolidate supply and provide guaranteed distribution to the various consumers at the end of its pipeline network. The elimination of large contracts between upstream and downstream created an efficient system of gas flow which the estate was fed.

Urban structure 
Couva is approximately 15 km from San Fernando, 10 km from Chaguanas and 30 km from Port of Spain. It has a general east–west orientation and sprawls the Caroni Central plains with a constant north easterly wind.

Couva benefits immensely from its unique location. The Sir Solomon Hochoy Highway ensures easy access to Port of Spain and San Fernando, in addition to the neighbouring towns of Chaguanas, Arima and Point Fortin. Transportation, Public Service Utilities, Shopping, Recreation and Entertainment, Health Care, Businesses, Schools and Industrial Centres are readily accessible.

The urban structure of Couva is similar to that of most towns in Central Trinidad with a mix of residential and commercial activity within the town centre itself, i.e. along the Southern Main Road. But recently people have begun buying land and starting their businesses out of the town centre areas in the communities of Balmain, Exchange, Point Lisas, Mc Bean and Camden.

Couva's major urban areas are: Downtown Couva, McBean Village (north of Couva town centre); Balmain incl. Central Park (east of the town centre); Isaac Settlement (south of the Southern Main Road); Lisas Gardens construction by the government (bounded between the Southern Main Road and Rivulet Road); Exchange Lots (north of Southern Main Road and in the centre of the town); California; Camden; and Couva North Gardens and Roystonia (north of Southern Main Road and occupies the former Exchange Estate area).

Phases 1–3 of the Couva North Housing Project (in Perseverance) was built by the Trinidad and Tobago Housing Development Corporation (HDC) and like Lisas Gardens is primarily Afro-Trinidadian. The HDC entered into a joint venture arrangement with the private sector to design, finance and construct Phases 4–6 of the Couva North Housing Project also known as Roystonia. This development has attracted primarily Indo-Trinidadian of middle income or upper-middle income background into the Couva area. These new communities have profoundly changed the character of the town and significantly increased the overall population of the town. The community is located East of Perseverance/ Waterloo Main Road, west of the Southern Main Road, north of Couva Main Road/ Carli Bay Road and south of the Exchange Road, Couva.

There are also substantial residential developments in progress within the Couva region on former Caroni (1975) Ltd. lands.

Consequently, the current services within Couva are under strain and are in state of transition or expansion to incorporate the new influx of residential activity.

Areas in Couva 
Couva consists of the following main population centres:

Communities 

 Downtown Couva
 Point Lisas
 California
 Balmain
 Preysal
 Mc Bean
 Orange Valley
 St. Andrew
 Exchange
 Camden
 Roystonia
 Couva Village Plaza
 Couva North Gardens
 Perseverance
 Sevilla
 Brechin Castle 
 Indian Trail
 Issac Settlement
 Calcutta Settlement
 Union Village
 Basta Hall
 Felicity Hall
 Esperanza
 Carolina
 Milton
 Dow Village
 Savonetta
 Shashamane
 Phoenix Park
 Windsor Park
 Central Park
 Vista Park
 Olive Grove Estates
 Lisas Gardens

Beaches and bays 

 Carli Bay
 Lisas Bay
 Congrejas Bay
 Margaret Bay

Electoral districts

The electoral districts are:

Economy 

Couva is the administrative and commercial centre of the region and the Point Lisas Port and Industrial Estate falls within the Greater Couva Urban Area. By 2011 Couva had the highest number (1789) of businesses in the region. With the closure of Caroni (1975) Limited and the resultant decline in sugarcane production, more lands in the Greater Couva Area will be under pressure for residential, commercial, and industrial expansion.

The main economic sectors in the region are as follows:
 Commercial business activities largely restricted to retail trade (personal and household products, auto parts and services, banks, and mini‐marts and groceries, etc.).
 Industrial development based on the existence of cement manufacturing in Claxton Bay by the Trinidad Cement Limited (TCL); petrochemical related industries at Point Lisas Industrial Estate; Petrotrin’s oil refinery operations at Pointe-à-Pierre; and other small light industry parks established by the Evolving Tecknologies and Enterprise Development Company (eTeck).
 Agricultural activities comprising livestock rearing, mixed agriculture, and other agriculture.

The Couva-Pt. Lisas Chamber of Commerce headquarters is within Couva located on Camden Road in Couva and its new building was commissioned 2012.

The town is served by all the major banks in Trinidad, e.g. Scotiabank (SCB), First Citizens Bank (FCB), Royal Bank of Canada (RBC), Republic Bank, and also the Unit Trust Corporation (UTC). Inclusive of these banks, there are numerous credit unions currently existing in Couva, e.g. TECU, Venture Credit Union etc.

Including many of the common fast food chains, Indian and Chinese food outlets as well as local franchises such as KFC, Subway, Church's Chicken, Pizza Hut and Starbucks, the most popular restaurants in the town include Balthazar, Bourgonvilla, Touch 'n' Taste, JZZ's International Steakhouse, Lady Gay and Kazza Pot & Kettle.

In addition, there are six beaches in the region where a significant amount and value of fish are landed. These beaches are Brickfield, Claxton Bay, Carli Bay, Orange Valley, St. Margaret Bay, and Waterloo.

Located in Gran Couva (east of Couva), La Vega Estate is a  hideaway with outdoor activities and interests for the whole family. Originally a cocoa estate, La Vega is now home to a unique combination of garden centre, plant nursery, nature and recreation park.

Transport 
The primary means of access to the region from areas in north and south Trinidad are the Sir Solomon Hochoy Highway and the Southern Main Road. Also, a route between Chaguanas and Rio Claro, in the form of the Caparo Valley Brasso Road and the Tabaquite Rio Claro Road, runs diagonally through the region. There is no strong road link with areas to the east of the region.

The Couva/Preysal flyover was previously one of the most congested flyovers in the country, and the main access point to and from the highway, but has undergone an extensive upgrade (completed in March 2012) and significantly alleviated these problems. Rivulet Road which extends from the Couva/Preysal flyover to the Point Lisas roundabout (and runs almost the entire south-west length of Couva) was extended to have a shoulder in 2015. This is expected to allow ease of traffic directly to the Point Lisas and the Couva town centre.

Access is also possible by sea through existing industrial port facilities at Point Lisas. Point Lisas handles approximately 45 per cent of container cargo and 90 per cent of break bulk cargo (goods that don't come in containers) for the country. The Port also handles about 60 per cent of local manufacturers' goods for export. Port Point Lisas is the second major port in Trinidad and covers a total area of approximately 19 hectares.

The national helicopter service is also based at Camden in Couva and the town is served by the Piarco International Airport which is located approximately 23 km away from the town centre.

Demography 

Formally a predominantly Indian locality, Couva became increasingly populated by Afro-Trinidadians, primarily from urban areas that had reached a saturation point in terms of job opportunities, as well as dilapidated rural areas. Even though Indo-Trinidadians remain dominant numerically, the presence of the Afro-Trinidadians changed the character of Couva. Afro-Trinidadian neighbourhoods center on National Housing Authority (NHA) housing projects, which were inaugurated by the government, and funded by oil revenues, to accommodate this new influx in population.

To its credit, the culture of the community is more or less a sample of the national culture. Religious practices and rituals are mainly along the lines of the Christian (Roman Catholic, Anglican, Presbyterian, Pentecostal/Evangelist, Seventh-day Adventist, Baptist), Hindu and Muslim faiths. The Seventh-day Adventist Church in Trinidad & Tobago had its genesis in the spot formerly occupied by the Heart and Hand Friendly Society Hall, and the Church has had a continuous presence since November 1895.

Education 
The University of Trinidad and Tobago (UTT) Point Lisas campus is located on Esperanza Road, Brechin Castle, Couva, about 35 kilometres from the University of the West Indies (UWI) campus at Saint Augustine. With its genesis in the Trinidad and Tobago Institute of Technology (TTIT), UTT initially focused on programmes in engineering and technology.

The construction of the first phase of the UTT aviation campus at Camden Base, Couva began in 2014.The entire project comprises three phases and the first phase was completed in 2015. Phase one includes construction of classrooms as flight device training facilities, ancillary facilities, outfitting and consultancy services.

Holy Faith Convent Couva, located on the Couva Main Road in Exchange Lots, was the first secondary school in the Central rural area. Established in 1951, it remained small until the introduction of free education in the 1960s. However, the warm, loving family atmosphere of the small school was well grounded to adapt, not only to over 700 pupils, but to a multi-denominational student body today.

The Couva East Secondary School (formerly known as Couva Government Secondary School) was built in 1963 and is directly opposite the Couva Magistrates Courthouse on Church Street. The school rose to prominence during the 1970s and 1980s, and since then has earned several national scholarships, and most scholarships gained by a government run secondary school, which is also among the best of the government secondary schools in the country. Today the school still remains prestigious within the Couva area.

The Couva West Secondary School (the former Couva Junior Secondary School established in 1972) is located on Balisier Street, Couva.

The Preysal Secondary School is located on Couva Main Road, Preysal, Couva.

The Exchange Presbyterian Primary School (at the corner of Bryce and La Croix Streets), has been consistently ranked highly in the national SEA examinations. 
The Exchange R.C. primary school is part of the compound of the St. Paul R.C. Church, and the Couva Anglican Primary is located further west on the Southern Main Road. The most recent of primary schools, the Couva South Government primary school is on Lisas Blvd. 
The Sevilla Private Primary School in the Brechin Castle residential compound is also considered one of the most prestigious schools in the region. There are several other primary schools within the wider Couva area (Balmain & McBean Presbyterian, McBean Hindu, Orange Valley Government).

The Rudranath Capildeo Learning Resource Centre (RCLRC) is located in McBean Village. The RCLRC is a training hub for professionals of the education sector. It is geared towards encouraging tertiary research in all aspects of education among the Ministry of Education's staff. However, its services extend further into the community, drawing users from the teacher training colleges, the University of the West Indies, other institutions and libraries, as well as members of the general public.

The NESC Skills and Technology Centre, Point Lisas is the main campus of the NESC. The centre, at the corner of Rivulet and Southern Main Roads, Point Lisas, replaced NESC's centre at Brechin Castle, which was transferred to the University of Trinidad and Tobago.

The construction of the NIHERST Science City in Indian Trail is planned for learning of science and technology. the centre will cover  and is an expansion of the National Science Centre in D'Abadie .

Health 
The region is serviced by the Couva district health facility. The Couva district health facility was the most heavily utilised of the South West Regional Health Authority's (SWRHA) district facilities with more than 162,000 people. The facility was to include an adjacent laboratory equipped to conduct lab tests such as complete blood count, renal function, liver function, blood glucose levels and other diagnostic tests.

The Trinidad and Tobago government, in a loan agreement with the Government of China, constructed a Children's Hospital and Multi-Training Centre for Medicine, Nursing and Pharmacology (using the UDeCOTT) which will be a self-contained, centralised medical facility equipped with the most modern and high-end medical equipment. The facility will consist of 230 beds, and includes a Burns Care Unit, central Pharmacy, Children's and Adult's Casualty Clinic, and Helicopter Rooftop Access for Emergencies. The completion date was 2015 but since the change of government the facility hasn't been opened as at 3 October 2018.

Sport 

The Ato Boldon Stadium, located in Couva, Trinidad and Tobago, is named after the eight-time Olympic and World Championship medal winner and 1997 200 m World Champion, Ato Boldon. The stadium was constructed in 2001. The National Men's Team and Women's Team use the stadium as their training centre. ABS is also the home of Athletics. Every year there are various National Tournaments and Invitationals held by various clubs and by the National Athletic Association. The capacity of the stadium is approximately 10,000 persons. Central FC plays its home games at the stadium.

The Sevilla Sports club is located south of Rivulet road and includes two tennis courts, swimming pool, golf course and snooker. The Brechin Castle Golf Course started out as a 9-hole course in 1927 and was increased to an 18-hole course in 1929/1930, but by 1938 nine holes had been reclaimed by the sugar cane factory when sugar cane crops were planted on the site and houses were built on it. The course is being used regularly for tournaments by other clubs and it also has its monthly medal games. The club house, called Seville Club, was formerly the residence of the manager of Brechin Castle.
The Trinidad and Tobago Cricket Board plans to rehabilitate, refurbish and develop the Balmain Cricket Centre to allow for playing cricket at the regional first-class level. The Gilbert Park cricket ground is located on the corner of the Southern Main Road and Rivulet Road. The Couva Recreation Ground and Balmain Cricket club ground are notable sporting areas in the town. W Connection, Wanderers C.C. and Clico Preysal Sports Club are notable cricket clubs in the Couva catchment area.

The National Aquatic Centre and National Cycle Track were opened in 2015 in the vicinity of the Ato Boldon Stadium. The Aquatic Centre includes a 50-metre swimming pool (to provide facilities for the hosting of and training for international competitions), a 50-metre warm-up pool, a 25-metre diving pool, and total permanent seating capacity of 700 seats. The National Cycle Track includes a  wood cycling track with embankment of 42 degrees to the International Cycle Union (UCI) standard Category 1, and 2,500 seats in the cycling track configuration.
Young Trinidadian and West Indies cricket team player Nicholas Pooran was also born here.
The Couva public swimming pool is located in Railway Station Road.

The Aquatic Centre, Cycling Velodrome, Ato Boldon Stadium, and the NCC are expected to make Couva the main hub of sports in the country.

Air services 
There is also an airstrip located on the outskirts of the town called the Camden Base, which was originally built by the US military during World War II. It handles helicopters as well as light aircraft and has a  x , paved runway. It is the main operating base of both National Helicopter Services Limited and Briko Air Services.

Briko Air Services Limited is a multi-faceted air transportation service company. The company's primary business activities include air charter services and agricultural aerial spraying services. Briko currently offers offshore energy production support, external lifts, environmental support, agricultural services, flight training and general charter services. The company's offshore energy production charter services provide transportation and support personnel, equipment and supplies to petroleum production service firms in support of the drilling for and production of oil and gas in Trinidad. Ad hoc services are being provided to The National Gas Company, Trinmar and other non-energy based organisations. Briko owns and operates a flight training school for fixed wing aircraft and provide flight support for pilots of the regional airlines.

The Government in 2011 had plans to build an airport by the Camden Airstrip.

The Trinidad and Tobago Government constructed phase 1 of the Aviation Institute of Trinidad and Tobago in the vicinity of the Camden base, as part of the University of Trinidad and Tobago. The institute is established through partnerships with Caribbean Airlines Limited (CAL), Metal Industries Limited (MIC), National Helicopter Services Limited (NHSL), with Anderson being the best Aircraft Engineer, second to Saroop. The Trinidad and Tobago Civil Aviation Authority (TTCAA) and the Air Guard. A Caribbean Airline Airplane landed there using the Camden Airstrip on the opening day of the campus.

Utilities
Electric generation is handled by Powergen and Trinity Power Ltd. at the Point Lisas Industrial Estate, while electrical distribution is handled by the Trinidad and Tobago Electricity Commission (T&TEC). 

Water and sewerage are under the purview of the Water and Sewerage Authority of Trinidad and Tobago (WASA).

The town is served by all major telecommunication (including cable, satellite) companies, e.g. Amplia, bmobile, Flow, DirectTV, Digicel+ and Greendot.

Culture 
Couva, which is known as the oldest sugar village in Trinidad, generated much of its prominence from its production of this major crop. To commemorate its historical involvement in the sugar industry, the Sugar & Energy Festival was founded by the Couva/Point Lisas Chamber of Commerce and held at the Gilbert Park grounds annually.

Couva is known as a focal point for the development and dissemination of Chutney music during the 1980s and 1990s. The Rienzi Complex typically hosts the Trinidad Chutney-Soca Monarch semi-finals.

Couva is one of the bigger Carnival hosts, with full shows on Carnival Monday and Tuesday. Jouvert is part of the Carnival Monday show and calypso shows are held in the town centre during the Carnival season.

Culturally, the town is the home of Couva Joylanders Steel Orchestra, a group well known for its varied repertoire and community projects. The band holds its practice sessions in a newly built steelpan complex at Railway Road, Couva, built by the Ministry of Works and Infrastructure in conjunction with National Gas Company of Trinidad and Tobago (NGC).

It is also the setting of Derek Walcott's play Beef, No Chicken.

Notable people
Nicholas Pooran
Denesh Ramdin
Lall Ramnath Sawh
Rangy Nanan
Rampersad Parasram
Roshan Parasram
Silvio Spann
Sarran Teelucksingh
Brian Haynes
Neil Benjamin

Sister cities

  Hartford, Connecticut, United States

References

Couva/Tabaquite/Talparo Draft Regional Development Plan

External links
 

 
Airports in Trinidad and Tobago
Populated places in Trinidad and Tobago
Populated coastal places in Trinidad and Tobago
Trinidad (island)
Ports and harbours of Trinidad and Tobago
Populated places established in 1797
1797 establishments in North America